Amber Rolfzen (born August 25, 1994, in Papillion, Nebraska) is an American volleyball player who plays in the German Women's Volleyball League.

Playing career 
She played for the University of Nebraska.
She participated at the 2016–17 Women's CEV Cup, with Dresdner SC.

Clubs

References

External links 

  http://www.cev.lu/competition-area/PlayerDetails.aspx?TeamID=9979&PlayerID=68952&ID=968
 http://www.teamusa.org/usa-volleyball/athletes/Amber-Rolfzen
 http://br.scoresway.com/www.fc-wetter.de/?sport=volleyball&page=player&id=6026

1993 births
Living people
American women's volleyball players
Sportspeople from Nebraska
People from Papillion, Nebraska
Nebraska Cornhuskers women's volleyball players